Gioia dei Marsi is a comune (municipality) and town in the province of L'Aquila in the Abruzzo region of Italy.

It is located on the Fucino Lake plain border, in the Marsica.

Twin towns
 Pratola Peligna, Italy

References

Cities and towns in Abruzzo
Marsica